This is a list of all personnel changes for 2022 Indian Premier League.

Retirement

Pre-auction
The BCCI set the deadline of 30 November 2021 for the list of retained players.

Player retention
 With a total salary cap of INR 90 crore available at the mega auction for each team, the eight franchises were eligible to retain up to 4 players with a maximum of 3 Indians, 2 overseas players and 2 uncapped Indians.
 The new franchises (Lucknow Super Giants And Gujarat Titans), can pick up to three players each out of all released players from the existing 8 franchises. The franchises can pick up to 2 Indian players and 1 overseas player.

The retained players were announced on 30 November 2021. The picks of the two new teams were announced on 22 January 2022.

Summary

Auction 
The auction was conducted on 12 and 13 February 2022 in Bengaluru. A total of 600 players were selected for the auction.
Prominent players like Aaron Finch, Martin Guptill, Suresh Raina, Shakib al Hasan, Eoin Morgan, Amit Mishra, Ishant Sharma and Andrew Tye went unsold.

Sold players

ACC-1/2/3: Players who were part of accelerated bidding.

Unsold players 

  Suresh Raina
  Steve Smith
  Shakib Al Hasan 
  Adil Rashid 
  Imran Tahir 
  Mujeeb Ur Rahman Zadran 
  Adam Zampa 
  James Vince 
  Marchant de Lange
  Saqib Mahmood
  Ashton Agar
  Craig Overton 
  Amit Mishra
  Aaron Finch (Replacement for   Alex Hales of Kolkata Knight Riders)
  Dawid Malan
  Eoin Morgan
  Ishant Sharma
  Chris Lynn
  Usman Khawaja 
  Lewis Gregory 
  Kane Richardson 
   Colin Munro 
  Marnus Labuschagne 
  Piyush Chawla
  Tabraiz Shamsi
  Josh Philippe
  Andrew Tye (Replacement for   Mark Wood of Lucknow Super Giants) 
  Rilee Rossouw
  Roston Chase 
  Moises Henriques 
  Kedar Jadhav
  Colin de Grandhomme 
  James Faulkner 
  D'Arcy Short
  Sheldon Cottrell 
  Reece Topley
  Todd Astle
  Martin Guptill 
  Ben Cutting
  Scott Kuggeleijn 
  Dhawal Kulkarni
  Darren Bravo
  Carlos Brathwaite 
  Keemo Paul
  Billy Stanlake 
  Cheteshwar Pujara 
  Saurabh Tiwary
  Qais Ahmad
  Ish Sodhi
  Najibullah Zadran
  Charith Asalanka 
  George Garton
  Liton Das
  Niroshan Dickwella 
  Andre Fletcher
  Rahmanullah Gurbaz (Replacement for   Jason Roy of Gujarat Titans) 
  Shai Hope 
  Heinrich Klaasen
  Ben McDermott
  Kusal Mendis
  Kusal Perera
  Sandeep Warrier
  Akila Dananjaya 
  Zahir Khan Pakteen
  Keshav Maharaj
  Waqar Salamkheil 
  Rahul Sharma 
  Hayden Walsh Jr. 
  Brandon King 
  Janneman Malan 
  Paul Stirling 
  Hanuma Vihari 
  Hazratullah Zazai 
  Akeal Hosein
  Karim Janat 
  Pawan Negi 
  Taskin Ahmed 
  Naveen-ul-Haq 
  David Wiese
  Shamarh Brooks 
  Avishka Fernando 
  Zubayr Hamza 
  Pathum Nissanka 
  Kurtis Patterson 
  Hashmatullah Shahidi 
  Manoj Tiwary 
  Gulbadin Naib
  Parvez Rasool 
  Dasun Shanaka 
  Wes Agar 
  Shoriful Islam 
  Josh Little
  Blessing Muzarabani 
  Jayden Seales
  Mohit Sharma 
  Barinder Sran 
  Neil Wagner
  Curtis Campher 
  Wayne Parnell
  Samit Patel
  Thisara Perera 
  Murali Vijay
  Jack Wildermuth 
  Hamish Bennett 
  Daryn Dupavillon 
  Fidel Edwards
  Hamid Hassan 
  Lahiru Kumara 
  Joel Paris
  S. Sreesanth 
  Oshane Thomas 
  Blair Tickner
  Isuru Udana 
  Mark Adair
  Hilton Cartwright 
  Gareth Delany
  Danushka Gunathilaka 
  Anaru Kitchen
  Dhananjaya Lakshan 
  Sisanda Magala
  Andile Phehlukwayo 
  Seekkuge Prasanna 
  Raymon Reifer
  Brad Wheal
  Sandeep Lamichhane 
  Tom Kohler-Cadmore 
  Harpreet Singh Bhatia 
  Laurie Evans 
  K. B. Arun Karthik 
  Kennar Lewis
  Ali Khan 
  Chris Green
  Ben Dwarshuis
  Jalaj Saxena
  Matt Kelly
  Rajat Patidar (Replacement for   Luvnith Sisodia of Royal Challengers Bangalore)
  Mohammed Azharuddeen
  Vishnu Solanki
  Manimaran Siddharth
  Sachin Baby
  Ricky Bhui 
  Himanshu Rana
  Harnoor Singh
  Himmat Singh 
  Virat Singh
  Arzan Nagwaswalla
  Akash Singh 
  Yash Thakur
  Vasu Vats
  Mujtaba Yousuf
  Tanmay Agarwal 
  Shivam Chauhan
  Nikhil Gangta
  Rohan Kadam
  Priyank Panchal
  Sameer Rizvi
  Ritwik Roy Chowdhury
  Apoorv Wankhade
  Atharva Ankolekar
  Tanay Thyagarajan
  Ankush Bains
  Prashant Chopra
  Kedar Devdhar
  Shreevats Goswami
  Akshdeep Nath
  Aditya Tare
  Upendra Yadav
  Pankaj Jaiswal
  Lukman Meriwala
  Vyshak Vijay Kumar
  Zeeshan Ansari
  Yuvraj Chudasama
  Dharmendrasinh Jadeja
  Khrievitso Kense
  Prince Balwant Rai Singh 
  Pardeep Sahu
  Sudhesan Midhun
  Sudip Chatterjee
  Hiten Dalal
  Abhimanyu Easwaran
  G. Rahul Singh
  Amandeep Khare
  Mayank Rawat
  Dhruv Shorey
  Hayden Kerr
  Saurabh Kumar
  Shams Mulani
  Dhruv Patel
  Atit Sheth
  Utkarsh Singh
  Kaif Ahmed
  Shubham Arora
  Eknath Kerkar
  Nikhil Naik
  Urvil Patel
  BR Sharath
  K. L. Shrijith
  Mohit Avasthi
  Sushant Mishra (Replacement for   Saurabh Dubey of Sunrisers Hyderabad)
  Matheesha Pathirana (Replacement for   Adam Milne of Chennai Super Kings) 
  Ganeshan Periyasamy
  M. Harishankar Reddy
  R. Silambarasan
  Aditya Thakare 
  Tanveer Ul-Haq
  Prithviraj Yarra 
  Satyajeet Bachhav 
  Chintal Gandhi
  Jake Lintott 
  Izharulhaq Naveed 
  Tanveer Sangha
  Manav Suthar 
  Milind Tandon 
  Sagar Udeshi 
  Kushaal Wadhwani 
  Akshay Wakhare 
  Qamran Iqbal 
  Ishank Jaggi 
  Rohan Kunnummal 
  Tanmay Mishra 
  Yash Nahar 
  Shubham Rohilla 
  Alex Ross 
  Naushad Shaikh
  Baba Aparajith 
  Prayas Ray Barman 
  Yudhvir Singh Charak 
  Shubhang Hegde 
  Roosh Kalaria
  Tanush Kotian 
  Kaushal Tambe
  Shivank Vashisht 
  Rahul Chandrol
  Harvik Desai 
  Cam Fletcher
  Tarang Gohel
  Fazil Makaya 
  Ryan Rickelton
  Sandeep Kumar Tomar 
  Siddhesh Wath
  CV Stephen
  Aniket Choudhary 
  Kartikeya Kak
  Kulwant Khejroliya 
  Ronit More
  M. D. Nidheesh 
  Babashafi Pathan 
  Vidyadhar Patil
  Mukesh Kumar
  Ramadoss Alexander 
  Adithya Ashok
  Jasmer Dhankhar 
  Prerit Dutta
  Jon Russ Jaggesar 
  S. Kishan Kumar
  Kevin Koththigoda 
  Swaraj Wabale
  Donavon Ferreira 
  Bhupen Lalwani
  Henan Nazir Malik
  Pukhraj Mann 
  Shashwat Rawat
  Jake Weatherald 
  Gerald Coetzee
  Akshay Karnewar 
  Sumit Kumar
  Abid Mushtaq 
  Muzaffar Nazir Lone 
  Ninad Rathva
  Shoun Roger
  Jaideep Bhambhu 
  Nandre Burger
  Vasuki Koushik 
  Akash Madhwal (Replacement for  Suryakumar Yadav of Mumbai Indians)
  Amit Mishra
  Anuj Raj 
  Abhijeet Saket 
  Rahul Shukla 
  Nuwan Thushara 
  Amit Ali
  Chaitanya Bishnoi 
  Mayank Dagar
  Migael Pretorius 
  Shivam Sharma 
  Pratyush Singh 
  Sanvir Singh
  Dhrushant Soni 
  M. Venkatesh
  Bandaru Ayyappa
  Gurnoor Singh Brar 
  Akash Kumar Choudhary 
  Mohit Jangra
  Aaqib Khan
  Ruben Trumpelmann 
  Lalit Yadav 
  Auqib Nabi Dar
  Chirag Gandhi
  Sijomon Joseph 
  Aniruddha Joshi 
  Shubham Sharma 
  Shubham Singh 
  Arpit Guleria 
  Vipul Krishna
  Safvan Patel 
  Chintla Readdi 
  A Manish Reddy 
  Ravi Sharma
  Shubham Kumar Singh 
  Corbin Bosch (Replacement for   Nathan Coulter-Nile of Rajasthan Royals)
  Nathan McAndrew 
  Diwesh Pathania 
  Shubham Ranjane
  Tom Rogers 
  JJ Smit 
  Sagar Trivedi 
  Harsh Tyagi 
  Rajendran Vivek 
  R. Sonu Yadav 
  V. Athisayaraj Davidson
  Ottniel Baartman
  M. B. Darshan
  V. Gowtham
  Khwezi Gumede 
  Liam Guthrie
  Liam Hatcher 
  Jay Bista
  Saurav Chauhan 
  Tajinder Singh Dhillon 
  Dikshanshu Negi
  Abhishek Raut
  K. V. Sasikanth 
  Bharat Sharma
  Shivam Sharma 
  Amit Yadav
  Manoj Bhandage 
  Arun Chaprana 
  Ajay Dev Goud 
  Divyang Hinganekar 
  Azim Kazi
  Sujit Nayak 
  Parth Sahani 
  Ashutosh Sharma 
  Vivrant Sharma
  Kumar Kartikeya Singh (Replacement for   Mohammed Arshad Khan of Mumbai Indians)
  Ravi Chauhan
  Shafiqullah Ghafari 
  M. Mohammed 
  Pulkit Narang
  Pradosh Ranjan Paul
  Pushpendra Singh Rathore 
  Jason Sangha
  Purnank Tyagi
  Samarth Vyas 
  Duan Jansen
  Dev Lakra
  Ajay Mandal 
  Lakhan Raja 
  Pareddy Girinath Reddy 
  Siddhant Sharma
  Matt Short
  Saurin Thakar 
  Nyeem Young 
  Yuvraj Chaudhary 
  Khizer Dafedar 
  Sahil Dhiwan
  Arjit Gupta 
  Mickil Jaiswal
  Ryan John 
  Jagatheesan Kousik 
  Jitender Chander Pal 
  Jonty Sidhu
  Yashovardhan Singh 
  Beyers Swanepoel
  Pranshu Vijayran 
  Ishan Afridi
  Mohammed Afridi 
  Prerit Agrawal
  Aidan Cahill 
  Mark Deyal 
  Nidhish S. Rajagopal
  Bavanaka Sandeep 
  Safyaan Sharif
  Henry Shipley
  Maxwell Swaminathan 
  Johan Van Dyk
  Dunith Wellalage 
  Agnivesh Ayachi 
  Aaron Hardie 
  Lance Morris 
  Rohan Rana 
  Kaki Nitish Kumar Reddy
  Hardik Tamore 
  Mihir Hirwani 
  Sairaj Patil
  Monu Kumar

Withdrawn players

Support staff changes

References 

Indian Premier League personnel changes
2022 Indian Premier League